At the World's Limit is a 1975 Soviet drama film directed by Rodion Nahapetov.

Plot 
The film tells about a guy named Volodya, who was tired of his relatives and decided to run away from them. On the way, he meets different people, gets a job at a construction site and falls in love.

Cast 
 Vera Glagoleva		
 Vadim Mikheyenko
 Boris Andreyev
 Mariya Vinogradova
 Svetlana Konovalova
 Vera Burlakova		
 Leonid Chubarov
 Makhmud Esambayev	
 Pyotr Glebov
 Mikhail Golubovich

References

External links 
 

1975 films
1970s Russian-language films
1970s teen drama films
1975 drama films
Soviet teen drama films